Illustrated Chips was a British  comic magazine published between 26 July 1890 and 12 September 1953. Its publisher was the Amalgamated Press, run by Alfred Harmsworth. Priced at a half-penny, Illustrated Chips was among a number of Harmsworth publications that challenged the dominance in popularity of the "penny dreadfuls" among British children.

After a brief initial run of six issues, Illustrated Chips was relaunched and ran for 2,997 issues. Harmsworth titles would enjoy a virtual monopoly of comics in the UK until the emergence of DC Thomson comics in the 1930s. In 1953 Illustrated Chips merged with Film Fun. 

From May 1896 to the last issue in 1953 the cover page held a comic strip featuring the tramps Weary Willie and Tired Tim (initially named "Weary Waddles and Tired Timmy"). A reader of Illustrated Chips as a boy, the Weary Willie and Tired Tim characters helped inspire Charlie Chaplin to create his Little Tramp character. 

Weary Willie and Tired Tim was created by illustrator Tom Browne, with Browne playing a major role in the evolution of the British comic style, influencing Bruce Bairnsfather, Dudley D. Watkins and Leo Baxendale.

Beginning in 1909 with Hounslow Heath the Highwayman, Alex Akerbladh created various cartoon strips for the magazine. Another notable feature in Illustrated Chips was Casey Court beginning in 1902 and continuing to the last issue. This cartoon involved a single and very busy picture where many kids from Casey Court, led by Billy Baggs, who were collectively referred to as the Nibs, would get up to some crazy scheme.

Illustrated Chips is no relation to the comic Whizzer and Chips, which launched in 1969. Coincidentally, however, both comics were eventually merged with Buster, with Illustrated Chips initially merging into Film Fun.

References

Sources 
 
 
 

Comics magazines published in the United Kingdom
Defunct British comics
Magazines established in 1890
Magazines disestablished in 1953
British humour comics
1890 establishments in the United Kingdom
1953 disestablishments in the United Kingdom
1890s comics
Comic strips started in the 1890s
1953 comics endings